MurE synthetase may refer to:
 D-alanine—D-alanine ligase, an enzyme
 UDP-N-acetylmuramoylalanyl-D-glutamate-2,6-diamino-pimelate ligase, an enzyme